Janam TV is an Indian Malayalam language news and entertainment free to air channel. owned by Janam Multimedia Limited. It was launched on 19 April 2015. Janam TV reached the no. 1 and no.2 positions in BARC ratings for Malayalam news channels in 2018.  The international office of the Janam TV is at Dubai.

History
In 2012, a promoter group consisting of Indian and non-resident Indian businessmen had applied for permission to launch Janam TV. The clearance for the launch continued to be delayed by the Ministry of Information and Broadcasting (I&B) for two years. According to the COO Rajesh Pillai, the channel was flagged due to connections between the promoters group with the Rashtriya Swayamsevak Sangh and the Bharatiya Janata Party, a claim that Pillai himself denied.

In 2014, the ruling United Progressive Alliance government was dislodged from power and the Bharatiya Janata Party led National Democratic Alliance formed a new government. The I&B Minister, Prakash Javadekar took up the cause for issuing clearance for the channel. The Ministry of Home Affairs granted the I&B Ministry with a report which acknowledged the connections but dismissed any concerns over adversity with the company or its promoters group.

Janam Multimedia Limited was the company which would operate the channel and the film director Priyadarshan was appointed as the chairman of its board of directors. In February 2015, the United Arab Emirates based chartered accountant and the director of the proposed channel, U. S. Krishnakumar issued a statement that the capital had been raised and Priyadarshan denied that the company had any political backing while stating that the channel was owned by 5,000 shareholders who had made investments in the company. The channel went on air from 19 April 2015 onwards, and was endorsed by the Kerala state president of the Bharatiya Janata Party.

Content 
Among notable events in its news coverage, the channel promoted the idea that the Hadiya case was a result of Love Jihad, a conspiracy theory developed by proponents of Hindutva. During the protests over the Unnao rape case and the Kathua rape case, it ran uninterrupted coverage of a "hoax hartal" in Kerala which depicted a violent hartal by Muslim organisations.

Sabarimala 
The channel took a hardline stance against the Entry of women to Sabarimala. It ran continuous programming of the development around the dispute at the Sabarimala Temple, claiming that only it showed the "truth" about the events. Its coverage presented an alternate reality on the events at the site of the temple. In one of its reports, it falsely reported that women were entering the temple with blood stained sanitary napkins and trying to throw them at the idol. The canard was picked up by a number of other websites and eventually referred to by the then I&B Minister, Smriti Irani as desecration of a sacred site.

According to the data on television rating points of the Broadcast Audience Research Council (BARC), the channel became the second most popular news channel in the state,  during the period between 3 and 9 November 2018. The rise in ratings of the channel was commended by the official Rashtriya Swayamsevak Sangh magazine Organiser, which published an article stating that Janam TV would bring electoral gains for the Bharatiya Janata Party in upcoming election in Kerala and that it signaled a growing acceptance for Hindutva in the state. According to former representative and media critic Sebastian Paul, the popularity was a temporary phenomenon and that the data itself was questionable due to the methodology used by BARC.

In 2020, BARC became the primary subject of a ratings manipulation case. During this period, the WhatsApp conversations of the CEO were leaked where it was revealed that he had discussed the ratings of Janam TV with his COO at the time of the Sabarimala dispute. The CEO in the conversation had also claimed that the Prime Minister's Office had taken note of the rise in popularity.

References

External links
 

Malayalam-language television channels
24-hour television news channels in India
Television stations in Thiruvananthapuram
Television channels and stations established in 2015
2015 establishments in Kerala